Hans Rebele (26 January 1943 – 4 January 2023) was a German professional footballer who played as a striker. He spent six seasons in the Bundesliga with 1860 Munich. He also represented West Germany in two friendlies.

Rebele died on 4 January 2023, at the age of 79.

Honours
1860 Munich
 UEFA Cup Winners' Cup finalist: 1964–65
 Bundesliga: 1965–66; runner-up: 1966–67
 DFB-Pokal: 1963–64

References

External links
 

1943 births
2023 deaths
Footballers from Munich
German footballers
Association football forwards
Germany international footballers
Bundesliga players
Austrian Football Bundesliga players
TSV 1860 Munich players
FC Wacker Innsbruck players
West German expatriate footballers
West German expatriate sportspeople in Austria
Expatriate footballers in Austria
20th-century German people
West German footballers